Moralism is any philosophy with the central focus of applying moral judgements. The term is commonly used as a pejorative to mean "being overly concerned with making moral judgments or being illiberal in the judgments one makes".

Moralism has strongly affected North American and British culture, concerning private issues such as the family unit and sexuality, as well as issues that carry over into public life, such as the temperance movement.

French moralists

North America 
In tracing the origins of moralism, sociologist Malcolm Waters writes that "Moralism emerged from a clash between the unrestrained character of frontier expansionism, a middle-class, Protestant emphasis on respectability cultivated in small-town America and an egalitarian and anti-intellectual evangelism among splinter Protestant groups."

In the 19th century, the issues of abolition and temperance formed the "twin pillars" of moralism, becoming popular through Christian Churches in the United States, both Protestant and Roman Catholic. Moralism as promoted by some Christian denominations, such as the Quakers, manifested in wide support for abolitionism. 

The rise of postmillennialism in the 19th century "encouraged a general culture of Protestant moralism and pushed it toward a series of social reform movements, from antislavery and abolitionism (freedom for the slaves now), to protests against Indian Removal, to antiwar and peace efforts, to women's rights, to temperance work before and after the Civil War." As such, the campaign for women's suffrage, evidenced by the ethos of organisations such as the Women's Christian Temperance Union (WCTU), was highly driven by the moralism of that era.

In the latter part of 20th century, as well as the 21st century, moralists in the United States turned their attention to championing the movement to criminalize abortion care. Moralists have also focused their efforts in maintaining blue laws, such as those that discourage Sunday shopping, in accordance with first-day Sabbatarian beliefs that attempt to resonate with the sensibilities of labourers and trade unions.

See also

References

External links 
World Women's Christian Temperance Union (WWCTU)
The Lord's Day Alliance of the U.S.

History of social movements
Christian theological movements
Abolitionism
Temperance movement
Morality
Trade unions
Women's suffrage
19th century in the United States
Pejorative terms